Wopkaimin may refer to:
Wopkaimin people
Wopkaimin language